Yvonne Lefébure (29 June 1898, Ermont – 23 January 1986, Paris) was a French pianist and teacher.

Born in Ermont, she studied with Alfred Cortot at the Conservatoire de Paris, taking a premier prix in piano and numerous other subjects. She performed with the Orchestre des Concerts Lamoureux and the Orchestre des Concerts Colonne and in recital. She performed at the first Prades Festival in 1950. She taught at the École Normale de Musique, Conservatoire de Paris and Conservatoire Européen, and gave masterclasses at her own festival in Saint-Germain-en-Laye. Among her pupils were Dinu Lipatti, Samson François, Imogen Cooper, Janina Fialkowska, André Laplante, Branka Musulin, Catherine Collard, Michaël Levinas, Françoise Thinat, Jean-Marc Savelli, Évelyne Crochet, István Kassai, Hélène Boschi, Martin Hughes and Avi Schönfeld.

In 1947 she married French musicologist Fred Goldbeck.

Sources
Carbou, Yvette, La leçon de musique d’Yvonne Lefébure, 1995 (with discography).
Timbrell, Charles, French Pianism: A Historical Perspective, 2nd ed. (Portland, 1999)
 Moritz von Bredow: Klang gewordener Geist. Branka Musulin zum 100. Geburtstag. Eine Hommage. Frankfurter Allgemeine Zeitung v. 14. August 2017, S. 10.

External links
Yvonne Lefébure teaches the music of Ravel

1898 births
1986 deaths
People from Ermont
20th-century French women classical pianists
Conservatoire de Paris alumni
Academic staff of the École Normale de Musique de Paris
Academic staff of the Conservatoire de Paris
Women music educators